Pine Island Cemetery (formerly Over River Burying Ground) is a historical cemetery in Norwalk, Connecticut. It is the second oldest cemetery in Norwalk. The cemetery is located behind Lockwood–Mathews Mansion on Crescent Street. 

The Connecticut Commission on Culture and Tourism added the cemetery to the state Register of Historic Places in May 2010.

On December 16, 1708 the town council granted this piece of land for a burying place. John Benedict, Zerubabell Hoyt and Thomas Betts were appointed to select the location.

Notable burials
 Samuel Kellogg (1673–1757), member of the Connecticut House of Representatives
 John Bartlett (1677–1761), member of the Connecticut House of Representatives
 James Lockwood (1683–1769), member of the Connecticut House of Representatives

See also 
 East Norwalk Historical Cemetery
 Mill Hill Historic Park
 History of Norwalk, Connecticut

References

External links 
 
 Pine Island Transcribers Notes
 Pine Island Cemetery – Listing A-H
 Pine Island Cemetery – Listing I-O
 Pine Island Cemetery – Listing P-Z

Cemeteries in Fairfield County, Connecticut
History of Norwalk, Connecticut
1708 establishments in Connecticut